Kilmory may refer to the following places in Scotland:

Kilmory, Knapdale, a hamlet in Knapdale, Scotland
Kilmory Knap Chapel, an ancient ruined chapel at Kilmory Knap
Kilmory, Ardnamurchan, a hamlet in Highland, Scotland
Kilmory, Rùm, an uninhabited village on the island of Rùm, Highland, Scotland
Kilmory, Arran, a village on the Isle of Arran, North Ayrshire, Scotland
Kilmory Camanachd, a shinty team based in Lochgilphead
Kilmory Castle, a historic house and gardens near Lochgilphead, Argyll, Scotland